Cenangiopsis is a genus of fungus in the family Helotiaceae. The genus contains 54 species.

References

Helotiaceae